Cardenasiodendron is a monotypic genus of dioecious trees in the subfamily Anacardioideae of the cashew and sumac family Anacardiaceae. It contains the single species Cardenasiodendron brachypterum, which is endemic to Bolivia.

References

Anacardiaceae
Endemic flora of Bolivia
Trees of Bolivia
Monotypic Sapindales genera
Anacardiaceae genera
Dioecious plants